Tom Koivisto (born 4 June 1974) is a Finnish former professional ice hockey defenceman who last played for Jokerit in the SM-liiga. He was drafted by the St. Louis Blues as their eighth-round pick, 253rd overall, in the 2002 NHL Entry Draft.  He played parts of ten seasons in the SM-liiga before coming to North America in 2002.  Koivisto spent most of two seasons in the American Hockey League but appeared in 22 National Hockey League games with the Blues in 2002–03.  He returned to Europe in 2004, spending two seasons with Frölunda HC in the Swedish Elitserien and then two more with the Rapperswil-Jona Lakers of the Swiss National League A before returning to Finland and Jokerit in 2008.

Career statistics

Regular season and playoffs

International

Achievements
 Pekka Rautakallio trophy for best defenceman in the SM-liiga - 2002

References

External links

1974 births
Living people
Finnish ice hockey defencemen
Frölunda HC players
HPK players
Jokerit players
St. Louis Blues draft picks
St. Louis Blues players
Sportspeople from Turku
Springfield Falcons players
HC TPS players
Worcester IceCats players